Technique is the fifth studio album by English electronic rock band New Order. Released on 30 January 1989 by Factory Records, the album was partly recorded on the island of Ibiza, and incorporates Balearic beat and acid house influences into the group's dance-rock sound. The album was influenced by the then growing acid scene, and Sumner's experiences at Shoom in London. It was also New Order's final studio album to be released under Factory Records (though not their final Factory release, that being the following year's "World in Motion").

Technique was the first New Order album to reach number one on the UK charts, and "Fine Time", the first single from the album, reached number 11. Remixed versions  of "Round & Round" and "Run" were also released as singles.

Music and background
In the late 1980s, the band felt that they had to keep on playing with dance-electronic rhythms. Bernard Sumner reflected; "We were in this position of being known for this dance-electronic sound and it would have been daft to have just stopped doing it. That was the nature of the time. The way I saw it was we were still writing band music as well, so we'd reached a compromise." Peter Hook joked that the album was "an epic power struggle between the sequencers and me. I was resisting it valiantly, because I still wanted us to be a rock band."

Sumner also wrote all of the lyrics. When recording on the island of Ibiza, the band was heavily influenced by the environment around them and became fascinated by Balearic club music. Gillian Gilbert recalled, "We had Mike (Johnson, engineer) with us, so there was always somebody doing something, but it was the beginning of us not being together in the studio when we were doing things. It was like, 'oh you do your drums today, and I'll do the vocals tonight...' The songs were sort of there but there were huge chunks missing. You'd leave blocks and say, 'will you fill that in? I'm off now.'" The band had chosen to record in Ibiza at Hook's urging after a series of records made in "dark and horrible" London studios. Stephen Morris described the sound of the Balearic beat clubs on the island they began to visit as "mad! They'd put an acid record on and then the next one would be a Queen one—it was schizophrenic, really. It'd be something really Spanish and then something really daft. It was a really odd mix but it all seemed to make sense when you were there. I don't know why that was. Maybe because we were all a bit out of our brains."

Following four months spent in Ibiza (with the album "20% complete", according to Sumner), the band shifted to Peter Gabriel's Real World Studios to finish recording, which Sumner referred to as a "much more sober atmosphere".

For Hook, "Technique sounds fantastic [...] considering it's not an Ibizan dance record. I think it catches a summer sound really brilliantly." Morris mentioned that the album had an "end of term, last day of school feel about it". To promote the album, music videos were produced for the three singles. An instrumental version of "Vanishing Point" was used at the time on the BBC series Making Out.

John Denver's publishing company later filed a lawsuit, alleging that the guitar break in "Run" too closely resembled Denver's "Leaving on a Jet Plane". The case was settled out of court.

Critical reception

Technique received generally positive reviews from music critics upon its release. Chris Roberts of Melody Maker hailed the album as "a rare and ravishing triumph", while John Tague of NME wrote that the band had "fashioned an LP of unflinching honesty, free from the masks of false identities of their past." The Village Voices Robert Christgau called New Order a "lot franker and happier (hence smarter) than Depeche Mode" and felt that the band had "lightened up". Los Angeles Times critic Craig Lee wrote that "with the exception of 'Fine Time,' there may be little new ground broken here, but when it comes to the sound of a broken psyche, New Order never misses a beat." Ira Robbins, in his review for Rolling Stone, stated that Technique "delivers a solid blast of sonic presence with immaculate playing" and called it a "surprisingly inviting album from this generally reserved outfit".

Technique has since garnered critical acclaim in retrospective reviews. John Bush of AllMusic referred to the album as "another classic record" by New Order and stated that their "instincts for blending rock and contemporary dance resulted in another confident, superb LP." Spin magazine's 1995 Alternative Record Guide cited Technique as New Order's best album because it represented the perfect synthesis of the band's abilities as a punk-influenced rock band and as synthpop pioneers. David Quantick of Uncut called it a "powerfully contradictory album: not only is it an Ibiza record that's New Order's least techno-ey, but it's a chirpy, upbeat album with mature lyrics". The A.V. Clubs Josh Modell referred to Technique as New Order's "last truly great album", as did BBC Music's Ian Wade, who added that the album showed "a New Order ready for the next decade, adding to their already superb reputation." Keith Gwillim of Stylus Magazine contended that New Order "may have made better records, but none of them defines them, sounds so quintessentially like what they were always reaching for, quite as well as Technique."

Tom Ewing of Pitchfork labelled Technique "magnificent" in 2008 and stated that the album "takes the easy interplay and full-band sound of Brotherhood and drenches it in good Ibiza vibes". However, he criticised the Collector's Edition bonus material as containing only "listless B-sides and instrumentals, and merely functional remixes".

Technique has been listed by several publications as one of the best albums of the 1980s and of all time. In 2006, Q magazine placed the album at number 21 on its list of the "40 Best Albums of the '80s". NME ranked the album at number 122 on its list of the 500 greatest albums of all time in 2013. The album is also included in Robert Dimery's book 1001 Albums You Must Hear Before You Die.

Track listing

Personnel
New Order
 Bernard Sumner – vocals, guitars, melodica, synthesizers and programming
 Peter Hook – 4- and 6-stringed bass, electronic percussion, synthesizers and programming
 Stephen Morris – drums, synthesizers and programming
 Gillian Gilbert – synthesizers, guitars and programming

Technical
 New Order – production
 Michael Johnson – engineer
 Richard Chappell – assistant engineer
 Aaron Denson – assistant engineer
 Richard Evans – assistant engineer
 Trevor Key – cover design
 Alan Meyerson – mixing
 Peter Saville – cover design

Charts

Weekly charts

Year-end charts

Certifications

References

Sources

External links

Album online on Radio3Net a radio channel of Romanian Radio Broadcasting Company

Acid house albums
New Order (band) albums
1989 albums
Factory Records albums